Forrest Landis (born August 9, 1994) is an American former actor, skateboarder, producer and writer. He is perhaps best known for his roles of Mark Baker in Cheaper by the Dozen and Rhett Loud in Flightplan. He has one sister named Lauren Landis. Landis has not acted in fourteen years and has taken up skateboarding.

Filmography

References

External links

1994 births
Living people
21st-century American male actors
American male child actors
American male film actors
American male television actors
Male actors from Florida
People from Palm Beach, Florida